The 2022 Abierto Zapopan, also known as Abierto Akron Zapopan was a professional tennis tournament played on outdoor hard courts. It was the 3rd edition of the tournament and part of the 2022 WTA Tour.

It took place in Guadalajara, Mexico from 21 to 27 February 2022 and it is a part of the WTA 250 tournaments.

Champions

Singles 

  Sloane Stephens def.  Marie Bouzková 7–5, 1–6, 6–2

Doubles 

  Kaitlyn Christian /  Lidziya Marozava def.  Wang Xinyu /  Zhu Lin, 7–5, 6–3

Point distribution and prize money

Point distribution

Singles main draw entrants

Seeds 

¹ Rankings are as of 14 February 2022.

Other entrants 
The following players received wildcards into the singles main draw:
  Caty McNally
  Katie Volynets
  Renata Zarazúa

The following player received entry using a protected ranking into the singles main draw:
  Daria Saville

The following players received entry from the qualifying draw:
  Hailey Baptiste
  Lucia Bronzetti
  Caroline Dolehide
  Brenda Fruhvirtová
  Viktória Kužmová
  Rebeka Masarova

Withdrawals 
 Before the tournament
  Rebecca Peterson → replaced by  Viktoriya Tomova
  Zheng Saisai → replaced by  Zhu Lin
 Retirements
  Emma Raducanu (left hip injury)
  Lesia Tsurenko (left elbow injury)
  Anna Kalinskaya (back injury)

Doubles main draw entrants

Seeds 

¹ Rankings are as of 14 February 2022.

Other entrants 
The following pairs received wildcards into the doubles main draw:
  Lucia Bronzetti /  Sara Errani
  Laura Pigossi /  Renata Zarazúa

The following pair received entry as alternates:
  Wang Xinyu /  Zhu Lin

Withdrawals 
Before the tournament
  Hailey Baptiste /  Caty McNally → replaced by  Wang Xinyu /  Zhu Lin
  Rebecca Peterson /  Anastasia Potapova → replaced by  Misaki Doi /  Miyu Kato

References

External links 
 Official website

2022 WTA Tour
Abierto Zapopan
2022 in Mexican tennis
February 2022 sports events in Mexico